Cannon to a Whisper is the only studio album by Philadelphia-emo/indie rock band Breaking Pangaea. It was released in 2001 on Undecided Records. The first pre-chorus of "Wedding Dress" was later re-used as the chorus of "My Blue Heaven" in Fred Mascherino's later band, Taking Back Sunday.

Track listing
"Sick Day"—5:41
"Wedding Dress"—3:26
"Suspended"—5:04
"Skylight"—4:17
"For a Word"—2:09
"The New Sound"—2:59
"...And Still They Hated It"—5:09
"Part"—2:00
"Walrus"—4:46
"Turning"—11:36

Personnel
Fred Mascherino—guitar, vocals
Clint Stelfox—bass
Will Noon—drums

References

2001 debut albums
Albums with cover art by Jacob Bannon
Undecided Records albums